The Marconi scandal was a British political scandal that broke in mid-1912. Allegations were made that highly placed members of the Liberal government under the Prime Minister H. H. Asquith had profited by improper use of information about the government's intentions with respect to the Marconi Company. They had known that the government was about to issue a lucrative contract to the British Marconi company for the Imperial Wireless Chain and had bought shares in an American subsidiary.

Insider trading allegations

Allegations and rumours about insider trading in Marconi shares involved a number of government ministers, including Lloyd George, the Chancellor of the Exchequer; Sir Rufus Isaacs, the Attorney General; Herbert Samuel, the Postmaster General; and Alexander Murray, the Parliamentary Secretary to the Treasury. The allegations were based on the fact that Isaacs' brother, Godfrey Isaacs, was managing director of Marconi.

Historians have explored the role of anti-Semitism in motivating the allegations. The allegations, whether true or not, were well-founded and serious enough to be brought to public attention. Particularly active in the attack was the New Witness, edited by Cecil Chesterton. This was a distributist publication founded in 1911 by Hilaire Belloc as Eye-Witness, with Cecil's brother G. K. Chesterton on the editorial staff. It had a Catholic perspective and was accused of anti-Semitism.

In February 1913, the French newspaper Le Matin alleged that Sir Rufus Isaacs and Herbert Samuel had abused their position to buy shares in the English Marconi company.  Both men sued for libel and Le Matin withdrew and apologised. During the case, Isaacs testified that he had bought shares in American Marconi and sold some on to Lloyd George and Lord Murray. It was not made public during the trial that these shares had been made available through Isaacs's brother at a favourable price. The factual matters were at least partly resolved by a parliamentary select committee investigation, which issued three reports: all found that ministers had purchased shares in the American Marconi company, but while the Liberal members of the committee cleared the ministers of all blame, the other members reported that they had acted with "grave impropriety". The truth of the matter has been described as "obscure".

Court case

Cecil Chesterton expected to be sued by the government ministers under the libel laws, which put the burden of proof on the defendant. Instead, Godfrey Isaacs, Marconi's director, brought a criminal libel action against him. The New Age (12 June 1913) described the trial

The court ruled against Chesterton and fined him a token £100 plus costs, which was paid by his supporters. Some of them claimed the decision would have gone differently had Chesterton's lawyer aggressively gone after the accused ministers who were at the heart of the scandal. In the next issue of the New Witness, Chesterton repeated his allegations against the ministers, who still did not sue.

Aftermath
The events were satirised by George Bernard Shaw as the "macaroni shares" scandal in his play The Music Cure, which was written to accompany G.K. Chesterton's play Magic, an attack on deceptive mediums which also referred to the scandal. In 1919, Cecil Chesterton's A History of the United States was published, posthumously. In the introduction, his brother G. K. Chesterton wrote this about him

In her biography of G. K. Chesterton, Maisie Ward devotes a chapter to the scandal and notes, "Four days after the verdict against Cecil Chesterton, the Parliamentary Committee produced its report". She goes on to describe that report: "By the usual party vote of 8 to 6, it adopted a report prepared by Mr. Falconer (one of the two whom Rufus Isaacs had approached privately) which simply took the line that the Ministers had acted in good faith and refrained from criticizing them". She concludes the chapter with these words, which suggest that, at the very best, the ministers involved lacked judgment,

Views
The historian Ian Christopher Fletcher wrote:

In 1936, G. K. Chesterton credited the Marconi scandal with initiating a subtle but important shift in the attitude of the British public:

The opposite view is argued by Bryan Cheyette. He wrote that the negative 'Jewish financier' stereotype was present first and indeed was established in British culture quite some time before the scandal broke.

Portrayal in media
Season 2 of the TV show Downton Abbey included the Marconi scandal as a plot point. Lavinia revealed that she gave information about illegal share dealing to Sir Richard Carlisle.

Notes

Further reading
 Reports from the Select Committee on Marconi's Wireless Telegraph Company, Limited, Agreement (House of Commons, 1913)
 Cheyette, Bryan. "Hilaire belloc and the 'Marconi scandal' 1900–1914: A reassessment of the interactionist model of racial hatred." Immigrants & Minorities 8#1-2 (1989): 130-142.
 Donaldson, Frances. The Marconi Scandal (2nd ed 2011).
 Gilbert, Bentley Brinkerhoff. "David Lloyd George and the Great Marconi Scandal." Historical Research 62#149 (1989): 295-317.

External links
 Article from the Museum of the History of Science, Oxford
 The Marconi Scandal David Lloyd George Exhibition, National Library of Wales
 Article from Today's Engineer Online
 Article from Physicsworld.com

Political scandals in the United Kingdom
1912 in British politics
David Lloyd George
H. H. Asquith